Boys' Reformatory is a 1939 American crime film directed by Howard Bretherton and produced by Lindsley Parsons for Monogram Pictures.  The screenplay was written by Wellyn Totman and Ray Trampe after a story by Ray Trampe and Norman S. Hall.

Cast
 Frankie Darro as Tommy Ryan
 Lillian Elliott as Mrs. O'Meara
 Frank Coghlan, Jr. as Eddie O'Meara
 Ben Welden as Mike Hearn
 David Durand as 'Knuckles' Malone
 William P. Carleton as Superior Judge Robert A. Scott  
 Grant Withers as Dr. Owens, a physician at the State Industrial School 
 John St. Polis as Superintendent Keene of the State Industrial School
 Pat Flaherty as Barnes, a guard at the State Industrial School 
 George Offerman, Jr. as Joey, an inmate at the State Industrial School

Works cited

External links
 
 

1939 crime drama films
1930s teen drama films
1939 films
American black-and-white films
American crime drama films
American prison drama films
Monogram Pictures films
Films directed by Howard Bretherton
1930s prison films
1930s American films